Fowler is a large lunar impact crater that lies in the northern hemisphere on the Moon's far side. It lies to the south-southwest of the crater Esnault-Pelterie, and north of Gadomski. Overlying the eastern rim and intruding into the interior is Von Zeipel.

The outer rim of this crater has become worn and rounded by impact erosion until it has become little more than an irregular slope down to the interior depression. A number of small craters lie along the rim and the inner wall. An impact along the northeast rim, just north of Von Zeipel, has a relatively high albedo and is surrounded by a skirt of bright material. This is indicative of a relatively recent impact that has not had time to darken due to space weathering.

The eastern part of the interior floor is partly overlaid by the outer rampart and ejecta from Von Zeipel. The southern floor is marked by an arc of small impacts. The northern floor is more level and is marked only by a few small craterlets.

Satellite craters
By convention, these features are identified on lunar maps by placing the letter on the side of the crater midpoint that is closest to Fowler.

References

 
 
 
 
 
 
 
 
 
 
 
 

Impact craters on the Moon